Pesäpallo (both names literally meaning "nest ball", colloquially known in Finnish as pesis, also referred to as Finnish baseball) is a fast-moving bat-and-ball sport that is often referred to as the national sport of Finland and has some presence in other countries including Germany, Sweden, Switzerland, Australia, and Canada's  northern Ontario (the latter two countries have significant Nordic populations). The game is similar to brännboll, rounders, and lapta, as well as baseball.

Pesäpallo is a combination of traditional ball-batting team games and North American baseball, invented by Lauri "Tahko" Pihkala in the 1920s. Pesäpallo has changed with the times and grown in popularity. On 14 November 1920, pesäpallo was played the first time at Kaisaniemi Park in Helsinki.

The basic idea of pesäpallo is similar to that of baseball: the offense tries to score by hitting the ball successfully and running through the bases, while the defense tries to put the batter and runners out. One of the most important differences between pesäpallo and baseball is that the ball is pitched vertically, which makes hitting the ball, as well as controlling the power and direction of the hit, much easier. This gives the offensive game more variety, speed, and tactical aspects compared to baseball. The fielding team is forced to counter the batter's choices with defensive schemes and anticipation.

The manager has an important role in pesäpallo, leading the offense by giving signals to the players using a multicoloured fan. The defensive team play is directed by the manager's orders and hand signals by the fielders.

Pesäpallo was a demonstration sport at the 1952 Summer Olympics, held in Helsinki, Finland.

Rules

A regular pesäpallo game is played in two periods of four innings each. A period is won by the team which scores more runs in its offensive half-innings. If the periods are tied, there will be an extra inning; if needed, there is a round (similar to a penalty shoot-out) where each team tries to bring a player home from the third base.

During an inning, both teams take turns playing offense (batting) and defense (fielding).

The defensive team has nine players on the field. The offensive team can use three jokers (similar to designated hitters) during one half-inning in addition to the nine players in the regular batting order. The offensive team can continue batting until three players have been put out or one round of the batting order has been completed without at least two runs scored. The batter and the pitcher face each other in the home base, on opposite sides of the circular plate. The pitch is delivered by throwing the ball directly upwards above the plate, at least one meter over the head of the pitcher.

The batter has three strikes available during their turn at bat. A fair hit does not require the batter to reach base; all three strikes can be used before the batter must reach first base. A pitch counts as a strike if the batter takes a swing at the ball and the umpire rules the pitch legal. When a batter makes a fair hit, unless it is the third strike, the batter does not have to try to advance safely to the first base. However, if the batter hits a foul ball on the third strike and does not try to advance, only that player is out and the runners continue with the next batter.

If the pitcher delivers two bad pitches (ball), the batter is granted a walk to the first base only if all bases are unoccupied. If there are runners on the field, the point runner (the runner at the highest-numbered base) is granted a walk to the next base for the second and all consecutive bad pitches pitched for the same hitter. A pitch can be ruled bad for various reasons, most common ones being that the ball does not fall on the plate or that the pitch is not thrown high enough.

A hit is foul if the ball first touches the field outside of the boundaries, the batter or the runners cannot advance on a foul hit. If a fielder catches the ball before it reaches the ground, the hit is a "catch", and all runners who tried to advance on that play are caught. Players who have been caught are removed from the field, but they do not count as outs.

The runner reaches safety on a base by touching the base area before the ball is thrown to a fielder in the base. If the ball gets to the base first, the runner is put out and removed from the field. The batter is also put out if the third strike is foul. A runner on a base is forced to advance if the next runner reaches safety on the same base.

The offensive team scores a run when a runner returns safely to the home base after advancing through all three field bases. If a batter advances to the third base on their batted ball, it is a "home run". He can then stay on the third base and try to score again as a regular runner by reaching the home base on a later play.

Differences from baseball

The most significant differences from baseball are:
The first bounce of the ball is decisive: It must bounce within the play area, and may then roll over a line and still be in play. The back line on the fly counts as a laiton (literally "illegal", a foul ball). The foul lines are also on the sides and the front of the field. So if a player aims high and hits a very hard hit that would be a certain home run in baseball, it is counted as a foul in pesäpallo. This increases the tactical approach. All home runs, therefore, are the "inside-the-park" variety.
Catching a ball in flight is not an out, but forces all runners advancing at the moment of the catch to attempt to reach the next base. If they succeed they must return to home base with no further consequences (this is called a haava, literally "a wound" or simply koppi, "a catch"). If they fail to reach the next base, they are out.
All other batting team players stand in a semicircle near the batter.
Players generally have little difficulty hitting the ball, so the main target is not just hitting the ball but selecting a suitable type of hit and directing it correctly. There are many different types of hits used, here are a few examples:
 Snap (short) hit: Normally used for advancing fast runners between bases, aimed to avoid defensive players. Usually hit in such way that the ball takes a hard spin.
 Fly hit: An intentional high hit to be caught, often used to give way for faster runners.
 High drive: Aimed to drop to the field between midfield and outfield, with a top spin. Excellent for scoring.
 Bouncer: Used for advancing fast runners, hit downwards very hard to be bounced right next to the front arc. Aimed towards the base runner is leaving, or to the center. Technically very hard to perform, used only by advanced players.
A home run is scored if a batter advances to the third base on his own fair hit. After a home run, the runner will stay at third base and can later score an additional point by advancing from third to fourth base.
Walking requires fewer invalid pitches. When the field is empty of runners, one invalid pitch grants a walk, otherwise two. After two invalid pitches, each such pitch grants another walk. A walk advances the point runner; if there is a runner at third base, that player shall score.
A fair hit does not force the batter to advance; he can use all three strikes at bat before he becomes a runner. A pitch counts as a strike, if the batter takes a swing at the ball or if the umpire rules the pitch legal.
"Force outs" are always outs: if the runner is off the base and the ball is in the control of a defensive player at the next base, the runner is out.
The bases are not laid in a diamond shape; the players have to 'zig zag' the court (see chart).
When entering a base or the home base, the runner only has to cross the line of the base; there are no actual cushion bases like in baseball, only lines in the field showing each base's boundaries (a much larger area compared to the bases used in baseball). Similarly, the pitcher or the fielders in the bases do not have any plates to touch to make an out; having only a foot in the base is enough.
The attacking team uses a colour-coded fan to signal the runners when to move. The fan is multicoloured, held by the coach of the team. Colour sequence is decided prior to the game.

Players

The team playing the defensive half has nine players in the field. The pitcher is positioned in the home base. A catcher plays in the infield on the side of the second base. Each of the three bases has its baseman and an additional two shortstops playing close to the second and third bases. Two outfielders cover the outfield. Players can switch their places and position themselves to the field wherever they want. Different positioning is used in different situations, when the defensive team can expect a certain type of hit. This is usually determined by the location of the offensive team's point runner. Special tactics could even be made against a certain batter.

The team playing the offensive half has nine batters and three additional batters known as jokers (The term "joker" refers to a wild card rather than a jester). Whereas ordinary batters must bat in a pre-designated batting order, the joker batters are allowed to breach the batting order.

Today, players usually have a specialized role in the batting order depending on their abilities. Fast runners are usually positioned first in the batting order, after which come players who specialize in advancing runners between bases. Next comes a player specializing in scoring runners home. Players from 6 to 9 often form another attacking combination. The jokers are usually a selection of either batting jokers (good hitters specializing in scoring) or runner jokers (fast runners specializing in advancing in the field).

Both teams have a pelinjohtaja, lit. a game leader or more simply, a manager. The captain of the team – one of the players – tries to beat the other team's captain in the hutunkeitto, draw of choice which determines which team gets to choose whether it will want to start in the offensive or the defensive half. The manager is also akin to a coach and he does not take part in the actual game.

Playing field
The outfield consists of everything that is fenced in on the playing field's lot, including bodies of water at Vimpelin Veto, and balls going underneath the fences at Sotkamon Jymy.

The playing fields are most commonly various mixtures of thin dirt comparable to tennis clay courts, sand, and sometimes artificial grass, for instance at Pesäkarhut. Normal grass is typically only seen near the outer fences.

Equipment

Helmet
Each player is required to wear a helmet when playing in an offensive inning. If a player sets at bat without a helmet an out can be marked for the team. Apart from the pitcher and the outfielders, fielders are required to wear helmets.

Glove
The glove is used to ease catching the ball when playing a defensive inning. The glove used in pesäpallo differs from the one used in baseball both in characteristics and in appearance, resembling more a hockey goalkeeper's glove. The glove is made of leather although some manufacturers use different kinds of synthetic fibers on the back side. The inside of the glove is always made of thick leather and the main differences between gloves lie in the amount and quality of padding, the thickness of the leather, the size of the glove and its shaping.

The ball is caught into the glove's cup between the thumb and the index finger. Sometimes, however, the ball hits the palm and a properly designed glove can prevent injuries.

Other devices to catch the ball are not allowed.

Bat
The bat is a round, tapered cylinder. Previously the bats used in pesäpallo were made of wood. These were fairly brittle and did not last very long when used to hit such a heavy ball. Now, wooden bats are only used in children's games and the bats used in adult's games are made of a mixture of glass fiber and carbon fiber.

The biggest differences between bats lie in the weight, center of gravity, flexibility and length.

The weight of the bat is considered to be its most important property. The heaviest bats weigh more than  but these are only used by strong players like batting jokers.

Spikes
The use of spiked shoes—like in running—is not required to play pesäpallo. However, they do help the player substantially in rapid situations, especially when playing on modern artificial grass fields which are very slippery to ordinary sport shoes. The artificial turf differs from what is used in football fields.

There are only a few manufacturers producing spikes designed for pesäpallo and many players use normal running spikes. Some shoes have also spikes at the heel but mostly spikes are positioned under the ball of the foot. Usually there are seven spikes in a shoe and they are 3–15 millimeters long. When playing on artificial turf the maximum length of spikes is 6 millimeters.

Ball
The weight of the ball varies by series:
 Men's ball 
 Women's ball 
 Junior ball

Competing

The Finnish championship series is known as Superpesis. Both men and women compete in their own series. The second tier is known as Ykköspesis, and the third tier consists of provincial leagues known as Maakuntasarjat. 

Teams from all three tiers are also eligible to compete in the annual Finnish open cup, known as Suomensarja.

Junior leagues for under-21 players exist for both men and women (known as Poikien Superpesis and Tyttöjen Superpesis respectively).

A Pesäpallo World Cup is played internationally every three years. In 2006 the fifth World Cup was played in Munich, Germany. Participant countries included Australia, Finland, Germany and Sweden.  The sixth World Cup took place from July 8–11, 2009 in Pori, Finland, with teams from Australia, Finland, Germany, Sweden and Switzerland.  The seventh World Cup took place in 2012 on the Gold Coast of Australia. The three teams were Australia, Finland and "Team Europe". The eighth World Cup was played in Lucerne, Switzerland in 2015 featuring Australia, Germany, Finland, and Switzerland.

See also

Finnish pesäpallo match-fixing scandal
Superpesis

References
Notes

Further reading
 Official International Rules

External links

Official International Rules of Pesäpallo
Pesäpallo fan page 
Superpesis 
Introduction to Finnish Baseball/Pesäpallo

 
Ball and bat games
Team sports
Baseball in Finland
Finnish games
Baseball genres
Sports originating in Finland